La Tribuna is a Honduran newspaper owned by Honduran former president Carlos Roberto Flores.

History
La Tribuna was founded on 9 December 1976 by lawyer, writer and journalist Oscar Armando Flores Midence. Subsequently, Midence's son, Carlos Roberto Flores, became the president, chief executive officer and publisher of La Tribuna.

References

External links
 La Tribuna online

Newspapers published in Honduras
Spanish-language newspapers
Publications established in 1976
Mass media in Tegucigalpa
1976 establishments in Honduras